Michael Green may refer to:

Academics
 Michael Green (biologist), professor at the University of Massachusetts Amherst
 Michael Green (physicist) (born 1946), professor at Queen Mary University
 Michael Green (political expert) (born 1961), professor at Georgetown

Entertainment
 Michael Green (agent), American talent manager and film producer
 Michael Green (artist) (born 1929), British painter and sculptor
 Michael Green (humorist) (1927–2018), British author and journalist
 Michael Green (radio), British former controller of BBC Radio 4
 Michael Green (writer), American screenwriter, comics writer, and television producer
 Michael Green (youtuber), American vlogger, son of The Angry Grandpa
 Mikey Green, British musician

Politics
 Michael Green (diplomat) (died 2012), New Zealand
 Mike Green (Michigan politician) (born 1948)
 Mike Green (West Virginia politician) (born 1973)

Sports

American football
 Mike Green (defensive back) (born 1976)
 Mike Green (linebacker) (born 1961)
 Mike Green (running back) (born 1976)

Association football
 Michael Green (soccer, born 1978), American defender
 Michael Green (soccer, born 1989), American midfielder and forward
 Mike Green (footballer, born 1946), English centre half
 Mike Green (footballer, born May 1989), English full back
 Mike Green (footballer, born July 1989), English goalkeeper

Other sports
 Michael Green (Australian rules footballer) (born 1948)
 Michael Green (cricketer, born 1891)
 Michael Green (cricketer, born 1951)
 Michael Green (field hockey) (born 1972), German field hockey player
 Michael Green (sailor) (born 1954), Olympic sailor
 Michael Green (sprinter) (born 1970), Jamaican
 Michael Green (swimmer) (born 1963), British
 Michael Green (tennis) (born 1937), American player in the 1950s and 60s
 Mike Green (basketball, born 1951), American
 Mike Green (basketball, born 1985), American
 Mike Green (ice hockey, born 1979), Canadian ice hockey centre
 Mike Green (ice hockey, born 1985), Canadian ice hockey defenceman
 Mike Green (racquetball) (born 1973), Canadian

Other
 Michael Green (architect) (born 1966), Canadian architect
 Michael Green (murder victim), lynched  in Maryland, 1878
 Michael Green (New York lawyer) (born 1961), District Attorney for Monroe County, New York
 Michael Green (theologian) (1930-2019), British Anglican priest
 Michael Joseph Green (1917–1982), US Catholic bishop
 Michael P. Green (born 1947), British businessman
 Mickey Green (born 1942), English criminal
 "Michael Green", pseudonym used by UK politician Grant Shapps as a web marketer
 "Michael Green", named used by activist/comedian Heydon Prowse when running against Shapps in the 2015 United Kingdom general election

Similar names
 Michael Greene (born 1933), film & TV actor
 Mike Greene (arts executive) (also known as C. Michael Greene), American arts executive
 Mike Greene (British entrepreneur)
 JaMychal Green (born 1990), American basketball player

See also 
 Michael
 Green (surname)
 Greene (surname)